Phi I or Phi 1 is a residential locality in south-western Greater Noida, Uttar Pradesh, India. Bordered by Omega I to the north and Phi II to the east, it is known to be one of the real estate hotspots of Greater Noida, alongside Omega II, Omega I, Phi II, Chi I and Chi II. It is named after the Greek letter Phi.

References 

Geography of Uttar Pradesh